Leslie Evershed-Martin, CBE (1903–1991) was a British theatre impresario, city councillor and optician.

He was born in Clapham, London in 1903. He was twice Mayor of Chichester
and founded Chichester Players in 1933, and the Chichester Festival Theatre in 1962. He was married with 
two sons and died in 1991.

Publications
 "The Impossible Theatre"

1903 births
1991 deaths
People from Clapham
Mayors of Chichester
British business executives
Commanders of the Order of the British Empire
Knights of the Order of St John